Michael Shelden (born 1951) is an American biographer and teacher, notable for his authorized biography of George Orwell, his history of Cyril Connolly’s Horizon magazine, his controversial biography of Graham Greene, and his study of the last years of Mark Twain, Man in White.  In March 2013 his Young Titan: The Making of Winston Churchill was published. In 2016 his biography of Herman Melville, Melville in Love, was published by Ecco/HarperCollins.

Education and career
Born in Oklahoma, Shelden earned his Ph.D. in English from Indiana University in 1979. He then began teaching at Indiana State University, where he was promoted to professor of English in 1989, and where he remains a full-time member of the faculty. For ten years he was a fiction critic for The Baltimore Sun, and from 1995 to 2007 he was a features writer for The Daily Telegraph of London, where he contributed several articles on notable figures in film, literature, and public affairs, including interviews with Nobel Peace Prize laureate Shirin Ebadi; American philosopher Richard Rorty; and feminist Betty Friedan. He also did one of the last interviews with actor Christopher Reeve. Shelden is married and the father of two daughters.

Literary biography

Shelden's first book, George Orwell: Ten Animal Farm Letters to His Agent, Leonard Moore (1984), was an edited collection drawn from letters between Orwell and Moore that Shelden found at the Lilly Library and was the first to publicize. In 1989 he published his literary history Friends of Promise: Cyril Connolly and the World of Horizon, which covered the decade of the 1940s when Horizon was the most influential literary magazine in the United Kingdom. The book was based on a large collection of Connolly's personal papers at the University of Tulsa, and on interviews with the magazine's former editors and assistants, including Stephen Spender.

Authorized by the George Orwell estate, Shelden's biography of Orwell was published in 1991 and was a finalist for the Pulitzer Prize in Biography. Among other things, the book included the first detailed account of Orwell's controversial list of people whom he considered politically dishonest and unreliable in British society.  However, Daphne Patai, in her 1984 book The Orwell Mystique: A Study in Male Ideology, described and discussed this list, which she had come across in the Orwell Archive in London.

Shelden's biography of Graham Greene appeared in a UK edition in 1994 under the title Graham Greene; The Man Within. In 1995 it was published in America, with revisions, as Graham Greene: The Enemy Within. Its "despoiling" portrait of Greene as a driven and devious artist provoked heated debate on both sides of the Atlantic. In The New York Review of Books there was an especially spirited debate between Shelden and novelist David Lodge on the question of Greene's anti-Semitism, with Shelden arguing that Greene's published remarks about Jews are "worse than anything in T. S. Eliot or Evelyn Waugh", and Lodge countering that although Greene drew "on social and cultural prejudices and stereotypes concerning Jews which were common in English society before World War II . . . to label it as anti-Semitic ridicule is crudely reductive."

Shelden is the author of Graham Greene's entry in the Oxford Dictionary of National Biography (ODNB).

In Mark Twain: Man in White (2010) Shelden wrote about the last four years of Twain's life (1906–1910), when the novelist began wearing his iconic white suit. The biography portrayed Twain as a vibrant figure who worked hard in old age to promote his image as a great popular entertainer, and to boost his reputation as a serious social critic and literary artist. Writing in Cleveland's The Plain Dealer, Mark Dawidziak described Man in White as "the definitive work on this controversial period." The biography was chosen as one of the Best Books of 2010 by the Library Journal, and as one of the Best Nonfiction Books of 2010 by the Christian Science Monitor.

Shelden's Melville in Love tells the story of Herman Melville's relationship with Sarah Morewood in the 1850s, especially during the period when Melville was writing Moby-Dick. The Library Journal said of the book, "Shelden carefully and convincingly presents his evidence regarding Morewood’s influence, and how she inspired Melville to a greatness recognized by few of his peers." In The Kenyon Review Mark Dunbar wrote, "Melville in Love is another masterwork by Shelden in the field of biography. Coupling diligent forensic scholarship with melodious narrative prose, he has discovered something new about an American author for whom the study of his life has turned into a minor industry of its own."

The annual review American Literary Scholarship (Duke University Press) said of Shelden's biographical skills: "Shelden possesses that rare gift of the truly talented biographer: he can sketch scenes so vividly that a reader seems to mingle with the subjects in their long-ago conversations."

Audio lectures

In 2011 Recorded Books released Shelden's The Lost Generation: American Writers in Paris in the 1920s. This audio collection of lectures deals mainly with Ernest Hemingway and F. Scott Fitzgerald, but also covers Gertrude Stein, Ezra Pound, T. S. Eliot, and many other authors. AudioFile magazine said that the “lectures evoke the bittersweet imagery, scents, and sensibilities of the literary history that graced the Right and Left Banks of Paris between the World Wars. Professor Shelden’s narration style is characterized by wry wit, passion, humor, and audible regret for having been born a few generations too late to have been part of 1920s Paris.” 

Shelden presents the Great Courses video lecture courses 'George Orwell - A Sage for All Seasons' and 'How Winston Churchill Changed the World',  also available as audio only versions.

Winston Churchill biography

Publishers Weekly described Shelden's Young Titan: The Making of Winston Churchill as "a fluid and informative examination of the early career of one of modern Britain’s most outstanding political leaders." The biography "tracks Winston Churchill’s coming-of-age from 1901, when he first entered Parliament, to 1915, when he resigned as First Lord of the Admiralty following the Gallipoli fiasco, with much personal material included."

In December 2012 Tom Brokaw wrote in the Wall Street Journal, "One tip for the New Year: Don't miss Michael Shelden's Young Titan, an account of Churchill's early years. Churchill's life is the gift that keeps on giving."

Reviewing Young Titan in The Washington Post, Jonathan Yardley called it a "perceptive and entertaining account," and observed that "the years about which Shelden writes have their own importance and their own color, and they tend to get lost in conventional Churchill biographies, particularly the overwrought ones (William Manchester does come to mind) that zero in on the heroic World War II years."

Describing Young Titan as "enthralling," Geoffrey Wheatcroft wrote in Newsweek that the book was "a vivid portrait of a young man on the make, as ambitious as he was gifted."

The Guardian in Britain said that Young Titan "reads in places like a novel" and features "some wonderful characters and plenty of the bon mots we have grown to expect from Churchill."

Interviews with film notables

During his years as a features writer for The Daily Telegraph of London, Shelden often wrote about films and interviewed many screen actors, including those active in the Classical Hollywood cinema, such as Maureen O'Hara and Richard Widmark. His Telegraph interviews took place in many locations in Europe and North America. In Canada he interviewed Sophia Loren. In Europe his interviews included visits on set with producer Jerry Bruckheimer in London and director Terry Gilliam in Prague. Among  those he interviewed in California were Robert Duvall and John Cleese. In Chicago he interviewed Gene Hackman, and in New York and Connecticut there were interviews with Gene Wilder and Isabella Rossellini.

His description of meeting Philip Seymour Hoffman at a diner in Greenwich Village is memorable: "He arrived at the diner ahead of me and was waiting glumly in a booth when I came through the door, a woollen ski hat pulled low over his eyes, his burly figure hunched inside a rumpled nylon jacket. With his scruffy beard, glinting spectacles and thick locks of ginger hair erupting from the sides of his hat, he has the look of a mad computer hacker, just released on parole."

Bibliography
George Orwell: Ten Animal Farm Letters to His Agent, Leonard Moore (1984)
Friends of Promise: Cyril Connolly and the World of Horizon (UK edition: Hamish Hamilton, 1989)   (US edition: HarperCollins, 1989) 
Orwell: The Authorized Biography (UK edition: Heinemann, 1991)  (US edition: HarperCollins, 1991) 
Graham Greene: The Man Within (UK edition: Heinemann, 1994) 
Graham Greene: The Enemy Within (US edition: Random House, 1995) 
Mark Twain: Man in White, The Grand Adventure of His Final Years (Random House, 2010) 
Young Titan: The Making of Winston Churchill (Simon & Schuster, 2013) 
Melville in Love: The Secret Life of Herman Melville and the Muse of Moby-Dick (Ecco/HarperCollins, 2016)

References

External links
Simon & Schuster Page for Young Titan: The Making of Winston Churchill
 Random House Page for Mark Twain: Man in White
 Michael Shelden Author’s Page at Faber
 Michael Shelden Author’s Page at Methuen
 Michael Shelden Faculty Page at Indiana State University
Michael Shelden Home Page
Michael Shelden Author's Page at HarperCollins

1951 births
Living people
American biographers
Indiana University alumni